St. Aloysius Catholic Church is a Roman Catholic parish church at 19 I Street in the Near Northeast neighborhood of Washington, D. C.  It is administered by the Jesuits since its founding and is named for St. Aloysius Gonzaga. It is often associated with Gonzaga College High School, to which it is physically connected.  The church building is listed on the National Register of Historic Places. In 2012 the parish was closed and merged with Holy Redeemer church.

History
The church building was constructed in 1859 and catered to many of the Irish Catholics that resided in the surrounding neighborhoods, particularly Swampoodle.

The New York Times reported that President James Buchanan and several Cabinet members were present for the dedication of the church on October 16, 1859. Jesuit Father Benedict Sestini, a Mathematics teacher at Georgetown University, served as the church's architect. The painting above the main altar, showing Aloysius Gonzaga receiving his first Holy Communion from the hands of Cardinal (St.) Charles Borromeo, was the work of the noted Constantino Brumidi, who is famous for painting the frescoes in the rotunda of the United States Capitol.

Brumidi was a friend of Father Sestini and depicted him and the pastor, Father Bernadine Wiget, in the painting. The model for St. Aloysius' mother was parishioner Adele Cutts Douglas, wife of Illinois Senator Stephen Douglas.

On September 9, 1862, three years after the church was dedicated, the District of Columbia's military governor made a requisition to Father Wiget to use the church as a military hospital.  This was at height of the Civil War and shortly after the Second Battle of Bull Run. The Pastor made a counter-proposal which was within the requirements and time-frame of the military governor.  Father Wiget offered to erect a hospital on K Street just north of the church and parishioners completed the 250-bed hospital in only eight days. In appreciation, the hospital was named St. Aloysius to honor the Church.

The church, one of the largest in Washington, D.C., has undergone several renovations/restorations. In 1892, the church was repainted, the current solid oak pews were added, and upgrades were made to the heating system of the massive church.

The church's interior was again painted in the 1930s. In 1958, Gibbons and Associates, a renowned church-decorating firm created a new interior scheme that incorporated mauve and teal with silver leaf accents.

By 1964, the area which served the diocese was changing rapidly, with urban development and high rise office buildings destroying the old neighborhood of small houses, with a primarily black population.  In that year, Father Horace McKenna, S.J., was brought from Ridge, Maryland, to serve as assistant pastor.  Through the efforts of Father McKenna and the formal sponsorship of Georgetown University as well as Gonzaga College High School, a new housing development was created, through which the original residents would be given priority in housing.  Washington attorney Eugene L. Stewart, a prominent Washington attorney, provided expert technical advice in bringing the project, named Sursum Corda (Lift up your hearts) to completion. Located between L and M Streets at First Street, N.W., Sursum Corda's original number of occupants was 1,100, of whom 700 were under 16. The housing project won architectural awards for the dignity of its design, in recognition that the project had created a village instead of a project.

Simultaneously with the development of the new housing,  an emergency feeding program grew to a formal organization called SOME (So Others Might Eat).   Dr. Veronia Maz, a sociologist at Georgetown University, Father McKenna, Father Ralph Kuehner, Rev. Griffin Smith of EEFO (Efforts for Ex-Offenders), Father Roger Gallagher and Father James Casey of St. Joseph's Church on Capitol Hill  joined together. The first meal was served on July 1, 1971.

In the mid 1970s with the majority of the neighborhood surrounded blighted and razed for office building construction, the dwindling congregation abandoned the upper sanctuary and retreated to the basement church for more than twenty-five years.

In October 1993, the parish began a complete restoration of the sanctuary. It selected Church Restoration Services as general contractor and decorator under the guidance of architect Duane Cahill. This $1.6 million interior renovation/restoration required scaffolding the entire sanctuary in order to replaster the more than 28,000 s.f. of wall area and installed 28 new ceiling panels with replicated plaster medallions. The sanctuary area was extended into the nave by removing much of the marble communion rail and building a larger altar area. In this renovation, the church was made handicapped accessible.

Under the direction of Stephen J. Ferrandi, the current color scheme incorporating various shades of blue accents over a base of cream colored walls accentuated by 23-carat gold leaf was installed. Upon completion of the restoration, the Painters and Decorators Contractors Association awarded this project the status of Best Restoration in the United States for 1994. The project was completed in July 1994.  In 2012, the parish merged with Holy Redeemer Church and the church was maintained and used by Gonzaga College High School.  The Father McKenna Center continued to operate in the basement of the church.

On April 6, 2017, a tornado caused significant damage to St. Aloysius Church, destroying part of the roof and causing damage to the interior.  No one at Gonzaga College High School was hurt.

See also
 List of Jesuit sites

References

Monagan John S. "Horace: Priest of the People", Washington, D.C. Rose Hill Books, 1985. pp. 113–121.

External links

Gonzaga College High School Official Site

Irish-American culture in Washington, D.C.
Churches on the National Register of Historic Places in Washington, D.C.
Roman Catholic churches completed in 1859
19th-century Roman Catholic church buildings in the United States
Religious organizations established in 1859
Roman Catholic churches in Washington, D.C.
Romanesque Revival church buildings in Washington, D.C.
Renaissance Revival architecture in Washington, D.C.
1859 establishments in Washington, D.C.